Giannis Fertis (born 25 August 1938) is a Greek actor. He has appeared in more than 40 films since 1961.

Selected filmography

References

External links 

1938 births
Living people
Greek male film actors
Male actors from Athens